Gujranwala Cantonment railway station (Urdu and ) is located in Gujranwala cantonment area, Gujranwala district of Punjab province, Pakistan.

See also
 List of railway stations in Pakistan
 Pakistan Railways

Services

References

Railway stations in Gujranwala District
Railway stations on Karachi–Peshawar Line (ML 1)
Gujranwala